Curtis Lester Patrick (December 31, 1883 – June 1, 1960) was a Canadian professional ice hockey player and coach associated with the Victoria Aristocrats/Cougars of the Pacific Coast Hockey Association (Western Hockey League after 1924), and the New York Rangers of the National Hockey League (NHL). Along with his brother Frank Patrick and father Joseph Patrick, he founded the Pacific Coast Hockey Association and helped develop several rules for the game of hockey.  Patrick won the Stanley Cup six times as a player, coach and manager.

Early career

Patrick's father, Joe, was the son of Irish immigrants: Thomas Patrick had emigrated from County Tyrone in Ireland to Canada in 1848 and settled in Quebec. Joe was born in 1857 and in 1883 married Grace Nelson. They moved to Drummondville, Quebec where Joe worked as a general store clerk and Grace was a schoolmarm. Drummondville was predominantly French-speaking and Catholic at the time, making the Anglophone and Methodist Patrick family a minority in the town. Patrick was born on December 31, 1883, in Drummondville, Quebec, the oldest child of Joe and Grace Patrick. In 1887 the family moved  to Carmell Hill, where Joe bought a half-interest in a general store with William Mitchell. As in Drummondville the town was mainly Francophone, leading the family to learn French. That winter Patrick and his younger brother Frank received their first pair of skates. In 1893 the family moved again, this time to Montreal, as Joe expanded his lumber company. They first lived in Pointe-Saint-Charles, a rail district, before moving to the more prosperous suburb of Westmount in 1895. While in Montreal the two older Patrick brothers were first introduced to ice hockey. They also met Art Ross at this time, who became a close friend of both brothers and had an extensive career in hockey.

With Brandon, Patrick first tried to carry the puck up the ice, which was unorthodox at the time for a defender to do. While the club questioned his motive, he argued that it was successful, and the fans enjoyed it, so was allowed to keep doing so. He also advocated for the two defenders to line up side-by-side, rather than one in front of the other as had been the standard since the beginning of hockey; this change was adopted by the team and soon widely adopted in hockey.

While back from school during a break in 1905, Frank briefly joined the Montreal Westmount club and played two games; this marked the first time the brothers played together. 

The son of a wealthy lumberman, Patrick was a great rover and defenceman who first came to prominence in 1900 when he played for McGill University. In 1904 he was the star for the Brandon team in the Northwestern and Manitoba Hockey Leagues and became the first defenceman known to score a goal. With Patrick at cover point, Brandon challenged the Ottawa Senators for the Stanley Cup in that season, but were defeated in the two-game, total-goal series.

He had greater success with the famed Montreal Wanderers in the 1906 and 1907 seasons. Scoring 41 goals as a rushing defenceman in just 28 scheduled games while serving as captain of the Redbands, Patrick led them to the Stanley Cup in both seasons. He followed that up by being signed as a high-priced free agent by the Renfrew Creamery Kings in the National Hockey Association's first year of operation, by which time Patrick was recognized as one of hockey's great stars.

Women's ice hockey
By 1910 the entire Patrick family would affect the Nelson, British Columbia Ladies Hockey Club. Sisters Myrtle, Cynda and Dora Patrick were all involved with the club. In 1911 the Nelson Ladies Club was coached by Lester, and Dora was the captain.

In the 1920s the Patrick family ran the Vancouver Amazons hockey team, owned by Frank Patrick and managed by Guy Patrick.

Pacific Coast Hockey Association
The Patricks long had western ties. Joe was a major lumber entrepreneur in British Columbia — and in 1911 he, 
Lester and his brother Frank had their greatest gamble, the formation of the Pacific Coast Hockey Association, backed with money from the sale of the family business. Luring away many eastern stars, the PCHA from the start was a prominent force in hockey, and for 15 years it would contest (along with the Western Canada Hockey League in the early 1920s) the Stanley Cup with its eastern rivals, the NHA and the National Hockey League.

Patrick and his brother Frank invented 22 new rules that remain in the NHL rulebook to this day. They introduced the blue line, the forward pass, and the playoff system, a change adopted by other leagues and sports around the world. After a suggestion by their father Joe, they began using numbers on players' sweaters and in programs to help fans identify the skaters. A new rule allowed the puck to be kicked everywhere but into the net, and allowed goaltenders to fall to the ice to make a save. They were responsible for crediting assists when a goal was scored, and invented the penalty shot.

Lester himself was the captain and star of the Victoria Aristocrats, winning First Team All-Star accolades three of the five seasons he played for them. The franchise — plagued by small crowds — was moved to Spokane, Washington and became the Spokane Canaries in 1916, and Patrick achieved his fourth and final First Team All-Star berth. After that season the Canaries were disbanded, and Patrick joined the Stanley Cup champion Seattle Metropolitans.

The Aristocrats were revived in 1918 as the Victoria Cougars, and Patrick took over as player-manager. Despite playing in only about half the games, he retired as a player after the 1922 season. Remaining with the Cougars as head coach, Patrick became the last non-NHL coach to win the Stanley Cup in 1925.

In January 1926 Patrick returned to the ice for the Cougars in an effort to help the team, which was playing poorly.

New York Rangers

The WHL survived one more year after the Cougars' Stanley Cup triumph. When the WCHL collapsed in 1926, the Cougars' roster was sold en bloc to an NHL expansion team that ultimately became the Detroit Red Wings. However, Patrick snubbed the new Detroit franchise and instead became the head coach and general manager of another expansion team, the New York Rangers. He played one regular season game for the team, on March 20, 1927, serving as a substitute defenceman against the New York Americans.

He is famous for an incident which occurred on April 7, 1928, during Game 2 of the 1928 Stanley Cup Finals against the Montreal Maroons. After starting goaltender Lorne Chabot suffered an eye injury after being hit by the puck in the middle of the second period, Patrick inserted himself into the game as the Rangers' new netminder, offering his now-teammates the words "Boys, don't let an old man down." At the age of 44 years, 99 days, Patrick remains the oldest man to have played in the Stanley Cup Finals. At the time it was not common for teams to have a backup goaltender, and the opposing team's coach had to allow a substitute goaltender. However, Maroons manager-coach Eddie Gerard refused to give permission for the Rangers to use Alec Connell, the Ottawa Senators' star netminder who was in the stands, as well as minor-leaguer Hugh McCormick. Odie Cleghorn, the then-coach of the Pittsburgh Pirates, stood in for Patrick as coach for the remainder of the game, and directed the Rangers to check fiercely at mid-ice which limited the Maroon players to long harmless shots. Patrick saved 18 to 19 shots while allowing one goal in helping the Rangers to an overtime victory. For the next three games, the league gave permission for the Rangers to use Joe Miller from the New York Americans in goal. The Rangers went on to win the Stanley Cup, their first in franchise history.

Patrick also guided the Rangers to another championship in 1933. He resigned as coach in 1939 for his one-time great center Frank Boucher, remaining as general manager of the Rangers and serving as an assistant coach to Boucher. and Patrick was again a Stanley Cup-winning general manager when Boucher led the Rangers to their last Cup for 54 years in 1940. Patrick retired as general manager in 1946, but stayed on as vice president of Madison Square Garden, finally exiting in 1950.

Later life
The championships trophy of the Western Hockey League, the Lester Patrick Cup, was renamed after Patrick upon his death in 1960. He was inducted into the Hockey Hall of Fame in 1947.

Patrick developed lung cancer, and his health quickly deteriorated. He died in Victoria after a heart attack on June 1, 1960, aged 76. Exactly four weeks later, he was followed by his brother Frank, 74. Frank's death was also attributed to a heart attack.

Legacy
The Lester Patrick Trophy, awarded for outstanding contributions to hockey in the United States, is named for him. He was also the namesake of the Patrick Division, one of the former divisions of the NHL teams. The division included the Rangers for its entire history and (except for the 1980–81 season immediately after the Atlanta Flames relocated to Calgary) consisted of only American teams.

The Patricks have been dubbed "Hockey's Royal Family." Lester himself was the father of Lynn Patrick and the grandfather of Craig Patrick, both of whom are themselves Honoured Members of the Hockey Hall of Fame. Another son, Muzz Patrick, was a star player and eventually coach and general manager of the Rangers. Lester's grandson Glenn Patrick played in the NHL during parts of the 1970s while another grandson, Dick Patrick (Muzz's son) has been president of the Washington Capitals since 1982 (he is also a minority owner).

Awards and achievements
Stanley Cup champion (6): 1906, 1907 as a player; 1925, 1928, 1933, 1940 as an owner/manager/coach

Career statistics

Regular season and playoffs

Coaching record

See also
List of family relations in the NHL
Patrick Arena

References

Notes

Citations

Bibliography

External links

 
 Lester Patrick, History by the Minute

1883 births
1960 deaths
Anglophone Quebec people
Canadian ice hockey defencemen
Canadian people of Irish descent
Hockey Hall of Fame inductees
Ice hockey people from Quebec
Ice hockey player-coaches
McGill Redmen ice hockey players
McGill University alumni
Montreal Wanderers players
National Hockey League executives
New York Rangers executives
New York Rangers general managers
New York Rangers players
Sportspeople from Drummondville
Renfrew Hockey Club players
Seattle Metropolitans players
Spokane Canaries players
Stanley Cup champions
Stanley Cup championship-winning head coaches
Victoria Aristocrats players
Victoria Cougars (1911–1926) players